Dana Greene Mathis (born October 3, 1954) is an American politician and coroner from Georgia. Mathis is a Republican member of Georgia House of Representatives for District 144.

Education 
Mathis attended Middle Georgia College and Gupton-Jones College of Funeral Service.

Career 
Mathis is a medical examiner, coroner and also owner of a funeral home.

On November 6, 2018, Mathis won the election and became a Republican member of Georgia House of Representatives for District 144. Mathis defeated Jessica Walden with 65.38% of the votes. On November 3, 2020, as an incumbent, Mathis won the election and continued serving District 144. Mathis defeated Mary Ann Whipple-Lue with 69.08% of the votes.

Personal life 
Mathis' wife is Ellen Mathis. They have three children. Mathis and his family live in Cochran, Georgia.

References

External links 
 Danny Mathis at ballotpedia.org
 Danny Mathis at ourcampaigns.com

American coroners
Republican Party members of the Georgia House of Representatives
21st-century American politicians
Living people
1954 births